The McLaren M3 was an open-wheel race car, designed, developed and built by British manufacturer McLaren in 1965. It was used mostly in Formula Libre racing, but was very versatile and competitive, and was also used in other motorsport categories and disciplines, such as hillclimb racing, and sprint car racing. It used no particular engine, but was capable of using (down to customers' own preference); an Oldsmobile V8, a Ford FE, a Ford Indy V8, a Repco V8, a Maserati V12, or even a  Coventry Climax four-cylinder Formula One engine. The chassis was constructed out of a tubular space frame, covered in an aluminum panel body, with extra aluminum riveted and bolted to the undercarriage of the car, to add extra strength and rigidity. This meant weight was around (approximately) .

References

M3
Open wheel racing cars